Winnebago Community Unit School District #323 is a school district in Winnebago, Illinois.

Schools
Winnebago High School
Winnebago Middle School
McNair Elementary
Simon Elementary

References

External links
 

School districts in Illinois
Education in Winnebago County, Illinois